Kenneth Ferguson McKernan (9 August 1911 – September 2009) was an Australian rules footballer who played with North Melbourne in the Victorian Football League (VFL).

Notes

External links 

1911 births
Australian rules footballers from Victoria (Australia)
North Melbourne Football Club players
Brunswick Football Club players
2009 deaths